Boubacar Sanogo (born 17 December 1982) is an Ivorian former professional footballer who played as a forward.

Club career
Born in Dimbokro in the Ivory Coast, Sanogo started his career in Tunisia and then went to Al-Ain FC in the UAE League, where he became well known for winning the AFC Champions League and being a top goalscorer in the UAE League.

He played for 1. FC Kaiserslautern during the 2005–06 season, scoring 10 goals in 24 games, a performance that caught the attention of higher level German clubs.

Then, he was transferred to Hamburger SV in the summer of 2006. His time at Hamburger SV was poor as Sanogo was often criticized and booed by the fans because in 31 games for Hamburg he managed to score only four goals.

After the 2006–07 season, he switched to Werder Bremen for a fee of €4.5 million, which could have risen to €6 million.

On 27 January 2009, Sanogo was loaned out to TSG 1899 Hoffenheim until the end of the season after he not succeeded in establishing himself in the first team. In his first game, he scored the second goal in Hoffenheim's 2–0 win against Energie Cottbus. His performance was good that 1899 Hoffenheim wanted to sign him on a permanent basis but he returned on 1 July 2009 to Werder Bremen.

Since missing a chance of joining 1899 Hoffenheim on a permanent basis, Sanogo joined French club AS Saint-Étienne on 19 August 2009 on a three-year contract. The transfer fee was €3.5 million. He scored his first goal for Saint-Étienne in a 4–1 win over OGC Nice in the Coupe de la Ligue. During this season, he injured his thigh. He remained injured several months, accumulating physical problems. He was on trial at AJ Auxerre, but Auxerre was not convinced. He returned to ASSE, but he was no longer used by manager Christophe Galtier and on 3 March 2012, Sanogo was released from the club.

Following his release from Saint-Étienne, Sanogo and his family returned to Germany, where he eventually signed a deal with 2. Bundesliga club Energie Cottbus. In his league debut for his new club, he managed to score a brace during a 2–2 draw in the season opener against FC Ingolstadt 04.

During the summer of 2015, Sanogo signed for Indian Super League side NorthEast United, but was ruled out for the entirety of the 2015 Indian Super League season after suffering a quadriceps tear during training.

On 1 May 2017, Sanogo signed for Liga 1 side Madura United. He was brought in after the club released Redouane Zerzouri due to injury.

In late October 2017, he joined German fifth-tier side VSG Altglienicke on a contract until the end of the season and scored on his debut away to Chemie Leipzig.

Sanogo retired in summer 2018, after his release by Altglienicke.

Post-playing career
Following his retirement from playing Sanogo became a coach at 1. FC Union Berlin.

Career statistics

International goals
Scores and results list Ivory Coast's goal tally first, score column indicates score after each Sanogo goal.

References

External links

 
 

Living people
1982 births
People from Dimbokro
Ivorian footballers
Association football forwards
Ivory Coast international footballers
2008 Africa Cup of Nations players
Bundesliga players
2. Bundesliga players
Ligue 1 players
UAE Pro League players
UAE First Division League players
1. FC Kaiserslautern players
Hamburger SV players
Espérance Sportive de Tunis players
Al Ain FC players
Fujairah FC players
Al Urooba Club players
SV Werder Bremen players
TSG 1899 Hoffenheim players
AS Saint-Étienne players
FC Energie Cottbus players
VSG Altglienicke players
Ivorian expatriate footballers
Ivorian expatriate sportspeople in Germany
Expatriate footballers in Germany
Ivorian expatriate sportspeople in France
Expatriate footballers in France
Ivorian expatriate sportspeople in Tunisia
Expatriate footballers in Tunisia